Sakawma is a 1959 Burmese black-and-white drama film, directed by Maung Chit starring Khin Maung Zin, Kyi Kyi Htay and Aye Ngwe Gyi.

Cast
Aye Ngwe Gyi as The King
Khin Maung Zin as The Prince
Kyi Kyi Htay as The Princess (Wunna Sadi)

References

1959 films
1950s Burmese-language films
Films shot in Myanmar
Burmese black-and-white films
1959 drama films
Burmese drama films